Viktor Nikolaevich Dobrovolsky (January 23, 1906 – July 28, 1984), was a Soviet and Ukrainian film and theater actor. People's Artist of the USSR (1960).

Biography
In 1928, he graduated from the drama school at Odessa drama theatre.
In 1922, he began his stage career.  Worked in theatres of Odessa, Kharkiv, Donetsk. In 1944-1956 — actor in the troupe of Ukrainian music and drama theatre named after Ivan Franko in Kiev. In the years 1964-1984 — the leading actor of the Kiev drama theatre named after Lesya Ukrainka. Since 1926 were in the movie. A member of the Union of cinematographers of the Ukrainian SSR.

Died in Kiev on July 28, 1984. He was buried on Baikove Cemetery.

Selected filmography
1926 - Taras Shevchenko
1938 - Pyotr pervyy
1940 - Makar Nechay
1944 - The Ural Front
1947 - Secret Agent
1951 - Bountiful Summer 
1953 - Adventure in Odessa''
1954 - Komandir korablya
1956 - Trista let tomu...
1959 - Nebo Zovyot

Honors
 Honoured Artist of the Ukrainian SSR (1943)
 Medal "For Valiant Labour in the Great Patriotic War 1941–1945"
 People's Artist of the Ukrainian SSR (1948)
 People's Artist of the USSR (1960)
 Stalin Prize second degree (1951) 
 State Prize of the USSR named after Taras Shevchenko (1983) - for the creation of images of Soviet contemporaries in the performances on stage KATRD name L.Ukrainki
 Order of Lenin (1951)
 Order of the Red Banner of Labor (1966)
 Order of Cyril and Methodius I degree (Bulgaria

References

External links

1906 births
1984 deaths
Burials at Baikove Cemetery
Ukrainian male film actors
Ukrainian male stage actors
Recipients of the Order of Lenin
People's Artists of the USSR
Stalin Prize winners
Recipients of the Shevchenko National Prize
20th-century Ukrainian male actors
Soviet male film actors
Soviet male stage actors